Ma Sanyi (born 1982-06-01 in Anhui) is a male Chinese Greco-Roman wrestler who competed at the 2008 Summer Olympics.

See also
China at the 2008 Summer Olympics for more details

References
 profile

1982 births
Living people
Chinese male sport wrestlers
Olympic wrestlers of China
Sportspeople from Anhui
Wrestlers at the 2008 Summer Olympics
Wrestlers at the 2006 Asian Games
Wrestlers at the 2010 Asian Games
Asian Games competitors for China
20th-century Chinese people
21st-century Chinese people